Espionage! is a role-playing game published by Hero Games in 1983.

Description
Espionage! is a system of modern espionage rules that use the Hero System. The rulebook (64 pages) covers character creation, skills, combat (melee and firearms), vehicles and car chases, and a sample espionage organization, the CIA. "Merchants of Terror" (16 pages) is an introductory scenario in which the heroes must track down a stolen atom bomb.

Publication history
Espionage! was designed by George MacDonald and Steve Peterson, and was published in 1983 by Hero Games as a boxed set including a 64-page book, and a 16-page book, and dice.

This system was later updated and republished as Danger International.

Reception
W.G. Armintrout comparatively reviewed Top Secret, Espionage!, and Mercenaries, Spies and Private Eyes in Space Gamer No. 67. Armintrout commented that "Espionage! is the most complicated of the games, but once you master the rules I think it's the most satisfying of the three. It seems realistic. The parts that bog the game own are the turn phase rules (where all characters try to move at the same time) and the body/stun damage points rules (which work nicely but take time to allocate). The game also suffers from shoddy editing, with some rules left unclear and a lack of necessary examples. Nevertheless, I managed to figure it out and I'm going to keep playing it, if for no other reason than to try out the excellent CIA adventures I hope Hero Games will continue to produce."

Nick Davison reviewed Espionage for Imagine magazine, and stated that "This is a very good games system which is not as expensive as it seems given the full module included."

Marcus L. Rowland reviewed Espionage! for White Dwarf #54, giving it an overall rating of 8 out of 10, and stated that "I liked Espionage - it's easy to learn, fast, sensible, and has no obvious errors."

Reviews
Different Worlds #31

References

Espionage role-playing games
Hero System
Role-playing games introduced in 1983